Love Is Blue is an album by American pop singer Johnny Mathis that was released on March 6, 1968, by Columbia Records and adhered even more strictly to the concept of the "cover" album of recent hits than its predecessor in that five of the 10 songs selected for the project ("I Say a Little Prayer", "By the Time I Get to Phoenix", "The Look of Love", "Never My Love", and the title track) were chart hits for the original artists within the previous year and another three ("Moon River", "Walk On By", and "Venus") had charted within the previous decade. Even the two remaining selections that did not bring chart success to the original artists were by the hit songwriting teams of Burt Bacharach and  Hal David ("Don't Go Breakin' My Heart") and John Lennon and Paul McCartney ("Here, There and Everywhere") and left no room for the usual inclusion of some original songs or material from Broadway.

The album debuted on Billboard magazine's Top LPs chart in the issue dated April 13 of that year and reached number 26 over the course of 40 weeks. It also made it to number 44 on the magazine's Best Selling Rhythm & Blues LPs chart during the six weeks it spent there that began in the July 6 issue. The cover of Frankie Avalon's "Venus" "bubbled under" the Billboard Hot 100 to number 111 during its one week on the chart in the issue of the magazine dated June 22, 1968, the same issue in which it also began its three weeks on the list of the 40 most popular Easy Listening songs in the US that included a peak position at number 23.

Love Is Blue was released for the first time on compact disc in 2009 as one of two albums on one CD, the other LP being the previous Mathis release, Up, Up And Away.

Reception
In his review of the album, Lindsay Planer of Allmusic compared several of the Mathis covers here to the original hits, such as "Moon River", which he found to be "arguably besting Andy Williams's on sheer emotive tone." He had similar praise for "By the Time I Get to Phoenix":  "When compared to [Glen] Campbell, Mathis imbues the material with a more understated and subtle empathy." He noted that "the entry that is most dissimilar to its origins" is "Here, There and Everywhere". "The slowed tempo and copious orchestration turn the melody into an epic torch song, as opposed to the less heavy-handed treatment by the Beatles" and adds that the rendition of The Association's "Never My Love" "retains a similarly light and otherwise unaffected overhaul." Planer also finds on the title track that "Paul Mauriat's upbeat Baroque flavor is all but forgotten as Mathis chooses passion over strictly pop in his excellent delivery."

Upon the album's 1968 release, Billboard also had high praise. "Mathis has come up with a repertoire of top tunes that fit excellently into his warm, romantic styling."

Track listing

Side one
"I Say a Little Prayer" (Burt Bacharach, Hal David) - 2:17
"By the Time I Get to Phoenix" (Jimmy Webb) - 3:18
"The Look of Love" from Casino Royale  (Burt Bacharach, Hal David) - 3:45
"Don't Go Breakin' My Heart" (Burt Bacharach, Hal David) - 2:24
"Here, There and Everywhere" (John Lennon, Paul McCartney) - 3:37

Side two
"Never My Love" (Dick Addrisi, Don Addrisi) - 2:41
"Moon River" from Breakfast at Tiffany's  (Henry Mancini, Johnny Mercer) - 3:07
"Walk On By" (Burt Bacharach, Hal David) - 3:03
"Venus" (Ed Marshall) - 2:40
"Love Is Blue" (Bryan Blackburn, Pierre Corr, Andre Popp) - 3:12

Recording dates
From the liner notes for The Voice of Romance: The Columbia Original Album Collection:
January 23, 1968 – "By the Time I Get to Phoenix", "Here, There and Everywhere", "The Look of Love"
January 24, 1968 – "I Say a Little Prayer", "Love Is Blue", "Never My Love"
February 3, 1968 – "Don't Go Breakin' My Heart", "Moon River", "Venus", "Walk On By"

Personnel
Johnny Mathis – vocals
Robert Mersey – arranger, conductor, producer
Frank Laico – engineer
Glen Kolotkin – engineer
Frank Bez – photography

References

Bibliography

 

1968 albums
Johnny Mathis albums
Columbia Records albums